The Inside of the Cup is a surviving 1921 American silent drama film directed by Albert Capellani and written by Albert Capellani and George DuBois Proctor based upon the best-selling novel of the same name by Winston Churchill. The film stars William P. Carleton, David Torrence, Edith Hallor, John Bohn, Marguerite Clayton, Richard Carlyle and Margaret Seddon. The film was released January 16, 1921, by Paramount Pictures.

Cast 
William P. Carleton as John Hodder
David Torrence as Eldon Parr
Edith Hallor as Alison Parr
John Bohn as Preston Parr
Marguerite Clayton as Kate Marcy
Richard Carlyle as Richard Garvin
Margaret Seddon as Mrs. Garvin
Albert Roccardi as Wallis Plimpton
Frank A. Lyons as Ferguson
Henry Morey as Beatty
Irene Delroy as Kate Marcy's Friend
George Storey as Garvin's Child

Preservation status
A print exists in the Library of Congress collection.

References

External links 

 
 

1921 films
1920s English-language films
Silent American drama films
1921 drama films
Paramount Pictures films
Films directed by Albert Capellani
American black-and-white films
American silent feature films
1920s American films